Rakesh Solanki (born 1 June 1985) is an Indian cricketer who plays for Baroda in domestic cricket. He is a left-hand batsman and occasional off-break bowler. He made his first-class debut for Baroda in the 2002/03 season.

References

External links 

Living people
Indian cricketers
Baroda cricketers
West Zone cricketers
1985 births
People from Vadodara